Bacadweyn is a  town in the north-central Mudug region of Somalia. It is mainly occupied in small-scale farming. It is administered by Puntland State. 
Secondary schools in the area include Ba'ad Weyn Secondary.

References

Populated places in Mudug